Montay Brandon (born September 3, 1993) is an American professional basketball player for the St. John's Edge in Canada. He played college basketball at Florida State, where he averaged 11.7 points per game as a junior. As a senior, he missed some time with a groin injury.

During the 2019–20 season, Brandon averaged 11.7 points, 11.6 rebounds, and 1.6 assists per game for the Edge. He was named to the Third Team All-NBL Canada.

In November 2022 Brandon was named an assistant coach at the University of Maryland Eastern Shore.

References

1993 births
Living people
American expatriate basketball people in Canada
American expatriate basketball people in Japan
American expatriate basketball people in Luxembourg
American men's basketball players
Basketball players from Greensboro, North Carolina
Florida State Seminoles men's basketball players
Kagawa Five Arrows players
Shooting guards
St. John's Edge players